The Black Bass is a fishing video game franchise created by Hot-B in 1986 and currently produced by Starfish.  Games in the series typically involve fishing for the titular black bass, often in the form of fishing tournaments across multiple lakes.

References

Fishing video games
Video game franchises
Video game franchises introduced in 1986